Stictonaclia anastasia is a moth in the subfamily Arctiinae. It was described by Oberthür in 1893. It is found in Madagascar.

References

Natural History Museum Lepidoptera generic names catalog

Moths described in 1893
Arctiinae